Sarah Morris (born 20 June 1967 in Sevenoaks, Kent, England) is an American and British artist. She lives in New York City in the United States.

Personal life and education

Morris was born in Sevenoaks, Kent, in south-east England, on 20 June 1967. She attended Brown University from 1985 to 1989, Cambridge University, and the Independent Study Program of the Whitney Museum of American Art in 1989–90. She was a Berlin Prize fellow at the American Academy in Berlin in 1999–2000; in 2001 she received a Joan Mitchell Foundation painting award. She was married to Liam Gillick.

Work 

Morris works in both painting and film, and considers the two to be interconnected.

From about 1997 her paintings were geometric Modernist grid designs with flat planes of colour; a related series was of glass-faced skyscrapers with geometric landscape designs reflected in their façades. Among her earlier painting styles were screen-prints reminiscent of Andy Warhol, word-paintings, and paintings of shoes.

Morris' films have been characterized as portraits that focus on the psychology of individuals or cities. Her films about cities, like Midtown, Chicago, Los Angeles, and Rio depict urban scenes, capturing the architecture, politics, industry and leisure which define a specific place. Other films describe a place through the viewpoint of an individual, like psychologist Dr. George Sieber describing the terrorist event at the Olympic Stadium in Munich in the film 1972 or the industry politics of Hollywood from the viewpoint of screenwriter and producer in the eponymous film Robert Towne.

Exhibitions
She has shown internationally, with solo exhibitions at Hamburger Bahnhof in Berlin (2001), Palais de Tokyo in Paris (2005), Fondation Beyeler in Basel (2008), Museum für Moderne Kunst in Frankfurt (2009), Museo d’Arte Moderna di Bologna (2009), and Musée National Fernand Léger in Biot (2012).

She has created site-specific works for various institutions including the Lever House, Kunsthalle Bremen in Germany, Kunstsammlung Nordrhein-Westfalen Museum, Düsseldorf, Germany, the lobby of UBS in New York City and the Gloucester Road tube station in London.

Morris' films have been featured at the following:

Ullens Center for Contemporary Art in Beijing (Entire filmography),
Fondation Louis Vuitton in Paris (Strange Magic),
 Museum of Contemporary Art in Chicago (Chicago), 
 Sotheby's in New York (Points on a Line),
 Barbican Centre in London (Beijing, Midtown),
 Guggenheim in New York (Midtown, AM/PM, Capital, Miami, Los Angeles), 
 Centre Pompidou (Midtown, AM/PM, Capital, Miami, Los Angeles).

Public collections 
 Albright-Knox Art Gallery, Buffalo
 Berardo Collection, Sintra, Portugal
 British Council, London
 Centre d’Art Contemporain, Le Consortium, Dijon
 Centre Pompidou, Paris
 Cooper Hewitt Smithsonian Design Museum, New York
 Dallas Museum of Art, Dallas
 Fondation Louis Vuitton, Paris
 F.R.A.C. Bourgogne, Dijon
 F.R.A.C. Poitou-Charentes
 Government Art Collection, London
 Solomon R. Guggenheim Museum, New York
 Kunsthalle Bremen, Bremen
 Kunstmuseum Wolfsburg, Wolfsburg
 Städtische Galerie im Lenbachhaus, Munich
 Miami Art Museum
 Musee d’Art Moderne de la Ville de Paris
 Museum of Contemporary Art, Los Angeles
 Museum of Modern Art, New York
 Museum fur Moderne Kunst, Frankfurt
 Sammlung DaimlerChrysler, Berlin
 Stedelijk Museum, Amsterdam
 Tate Modern, London
 UBS Art Collection, New York
 Yale Center for British Art, New Haven
 Victoria and Albert Museum, London

Filmography 

 Midtown (1998)
 AM/PM (1999)
 Capital (2000)
 Miami (2002)
 Los Angeles (2004)
 Robert Towne (2006)
 1972 (2008)
 Beijing (2008)
 Points on a Line (2010)
 Chicago (2011)
 Rio (2012)
 Strange Magic (2014)
 Abu Dhabi (2016)
 Finite and Infinite Games (2017)
 Sakura (2019)

Other activities
 Americans for the Arts, Member of the Artists Committee

Origami lawsuit
In 2011 Morris was sued by a group of six origami artists, including American Robert J. Lang. They alleged that in 24 works (eventually discovered to be 33 or more) in her "Origami" series of paintings Morris had without permission or credit copied their original crease patterns, coloured them, and sold them as "found" or "traditional" designs.

The case was settled out of court early in 2013; under the terms of the settlement, the creators of the crease patterns are to be given credit when the works are displayed.

Notes

References

Further reading 

 Modern Worlds, 1999 
 Capital, 2001 
 Sarah Morris: Bar Nothing, 2004 
 Los Angeles, 2005 
 1972, 2008 
 Sarah Morris: Lesser Panda, 2008 
 Beijing, 2009 
 Sarah Morris: Clips, Knots, and 1972, 2010 
 You Cannot Trust A Surface, 2011 
 An Open System Meets an Open System: Sarah Morris and Hans Ulrich Obrist in Conversation, 2013 
 Sarah Morris: Bye Bye Brazil, 2013 
 Sarah Morris: Mechanical Ballet, 2014 
 Frédéric Paul, 
 
 Two Erasing Principles, 2016 
 Sarah Morris, 2018 
 Michael Archer. "Sarah Morris", Artforum, May 2009, p. 170
 Nick Haymes, "Sarah Morris", Art Review, May 2009, pp. 70–7
 Hans Ulrich Obrist, "Sarah Morris", Adam & Eve, March/April/May 2009, pp. 78–91
 Eric Banks, "Seeing Red", Men's Vogue, August 2008, pp. 114–119
 Adrian Searle, "Dazzled by the Rings",  The Guardian, 30 July 2008
 Christopher Turner, "Beijing City Symphony", Modern Painters,  July/August 2008, pp. 56–59
 Marcus Verhagen, "Nomadism", Art Monthly October 2006
 Tanja Widmann, "To Offer You Something", Texte Zur Kunst, September 2006, pp. 248–251
 Ezra Petronio and Stephanie Moisdon, "Bar Nothing by Sarah Morris", Self Service, Issue No.21, Fall/Winter 2004, pp. 302–315
 Art Now (25th Anniversary Edition), edited by Uta Grosenick, Burkhard Riemschneider, Taschen, pp. 196–199, 2005

1967 births
Living people
20th-century English painters
21st-century English painters
20th-century English women artists
21st-century English women artists
British filmmakers
Brown University alumni
English contemporary artists
English women painters
People from Sevenoaks